Susan McCabe (born in Los Angeles) is an American poet and scholar. She is currently a Professor of English at the University of Southern California.

Life
Susan McCabe received her Ph.D in  Literature at UCLA. She has taught at the University of Oregon and Arizona State University. 
She currently lives in Los Angeles and teaches in the PhD in Creative Writing & Literature program at the University of Southern California.

Poetry
McCabe is the author of several books of poetry, most recently Descartes' Nightmare.

Scholarly work

From 2005-2006 Susan McCabe was the president of the Modernist Studies Association. Focusing particularly on Modernist poetry, McCabe's most recent book of criticism is Cinematic Modernism: Modern Poetry & Film (Cambridge University, 2005), out in paperback in 2009.  Her critical literary biography H.D. and Bryher: A modernist love story will be out from Oxford University Press in 2018.
She has published many reviews and articles ranging on topics of Hitchcock, Telephonics, Stein, and other 20th century figures or cultural movements.

Her first book of poems, Swirl (2003), was nominated for a Lambda Award.  She won the Agha Shahid Ali Award for Descartes' NIghmare in 2007, selected by Cole Swensen, and published by Utalh University Press in 2008.  She is working on a book of poems about the tense interface between humans, cyborgs, machines as we inhabit what she calls the "bi-centurian" perspective.

Honors
Maria Sutton Weeks Fellow at the {Stanford Humanities Research Center], 2016-2017
Yale University Reinecke Library Fellowship, Fall 2017
 Fellow (or Equivalent) of National Society in Discipline, American Academy in Berlin, Fall 2011    
 Mellon Award for Graduate Mentoring, 2009-2010  
 Advancing Scholarship in the Humanities & Social Sciences, 2008-2009 
 Agha Shahid Ali Award, First Prize for Poetry Book, Fall 2007    
 Fulbright Award, Research/Lecturer at Lund University, Sweden, Spring 2006   
 Yale University Beinecke Library Fellowship, 2005   
 Center for Feminist Research Travel Grant, Spring 2004   
 USC Zumberge Research and Innovation Fund Award, Fall 2000
 Outstanding Mentor Award for Graduate Students, Arizona State University, 1998-1999

Bibliography
 “‘Geographical Emotions’: Bryher & Walter Benjamin, ‘the last European,’” H.D.’s Trilogy and Beyond, eds by Helene Aji and Antoine Cazé, Presses Universitaires De Paris Quest, Summer 2014: 71-99.
“Luis Buñuel's Angel and Maya Deren's Meshes:  Trance and the Cultural Imaginary,” Blackwell Companion to Luis Buñuel, eds. by Julian Abilla-Gutierrez and Robert Stone, Spring 2013: 590-607. 
“Close Up and the Wars They Saw: From Visual Erotics to a Transferential Politics,” The Space Between: 1900-1945, January 8.1 2013: 11-33.
 "'Say Can You See a Wind from the East:' Gertrude Stein and a Feminist Is". (Christine Wertheim, Ed.). (2009; Les Figues Press)
 Descartes' Nightmare: A Book of Poems. (Kate Coles, Ed.). (2008; University of Utah Press)
 Cinematic Modernism: Modern Poetry and Film. Cambridge, UK: Cambridge University Press. (2005)
Introduction and biography for Visa for Avalon by Bryher, new reprint from Paris Press, Fall 2004. (Select Reviews: Maureen Corrigan on National Public Radio’s “Fresh Air!”; Margaret Atwood, New York Review of Books; Alicia Ostriker, Women’s Review of Books), pp. xi-xxii; pp. 151–8.
 Swirl. Red Hen Press. (2003)
“Borderline Modernism: Paul Robeson and the Femme Fatale,” Callaloo 25:2, Spring 2002: 640-53.
 Elizabeth Bishop: Her Poetics of Loss. Pennsylvania University State Press. (1994)

References

 Susan McCabe's USC Faculty Profile

21st-century American poets
Modernism
Living people
University of California, Los Angeles alumni
Year of birth missing (living people)